Seven Lakes is a census-designated place (CDP) in Moore County, North Carolina, United States. It is located approximately 10–15 minutes  from the Pinehurst #2, where three U.S. Opens have been held, in 1999, 2005, and 2014. In 2018, the population of the Seven Lakes CDP was 4,404.

Features
The Seven Lakes community includes the North, South and West side communities.  North and South operate under one Homeowners Association The West Side operates under a separate Homeowners association.

The main North side  has seven lakes along with other amenities including horse stable providing trail rides for residences, a community pool, soccer field, basketball courts tennis courts, and playground. Additionally, the community has a private gym with pool and tennis club for use with additional membership. The two largest lakes are Sequoia and Echo which allow motor boat usage with the other lakes limited paddle or electric motors. The South side does not have any lakes for recreational activities, but includes an 18-hole golf course.

Areas

Seven Lakes West 

 Seven Lakes West includes a large  spring-fed lake named Lake Auman.
 It is a community of 3,000 acres (12 m2).
 Voted as "America's 100 Best Master Planned Communities" by Where to Retire magazine.
 Includes two different pools, tennis courts, pickleball and walking trails.
 Includes an 18-hole golf course, named Beacon Ridge.
 Beacon Ridge is a Par 72 Golf Course, Built in 1989 it is a Gene Hamm design.
 Lake Auman participated in the Great North American Secchi Dip-In in 2001. The report basically said Lake Auman was the clearest lake south of the Great Lakes, east of the Rockies and north of Silver Springs Florida.
 Seven Lakes West has added a new addition to its community. These lots are zoned to accommodate home owners who want to own horses or those who would just like a large lot.

Seven Lakes North & South
 Communities that includes a full park & playground, with a pool.
 Horseback riding.
 Tennis Courts.
 a privately owned and operated Fitness Center that can be joined for a fee.
 8 to 9 smaller lakes.
 Country Club with golf course.

Geography
Seven Lakes is located at  (35.262296, -79.584963).

Demographics

2020 census

As of the 2020 United States census, there were 4,900 people, 2,134 households, and 1,555 families residing in the CDP.

2000 census
As of the census of 2000, there were 3,214 people, 1,399 households, and 1,141 families residing in the CDP. The population density was 391.8 people per square mile (151.3/km). There were 1,537 housing units at an average density of 187.4 per square mile (72.4/km). The racial makeup of the CDP was 94.96% White, 3.73% African American, 0.22% Native American, 0.19% Asian, 0.12% from other races, and 0.78% from two or more races. Hispanic or Latino of any race were 0.81% of the population.

There were 1,399 households, out of which 17.9% had children under the age of 18 living with them, 76.3% were married couples living together, 4.4% had a female householder with no husband present, and 18.4% were non-families. 16.9% of all households were made up of individuals, and 12.2% had someone living alone who was 65 years of age or older. The average household size was 2.26 and the average family size was 2.47.

In the CDP, the population was spread out, with 14.9% under the age of 18, 2.3% from 18 to 24, 14.9% from 25 to 44, 25.5% from 45 to 64, and 42.5% who were 65 years of age or older. The median age was 60 years. For every 100 females, there were 90.5 males. For every 100 females age 18 and over, there were 90.0 males.

The median income for a household in the CDP was $53,237, and the median income for a family was $59,180. Males had a median income of $50,909 versus $31,776 for females. The per capita income for the CDP was $32,070. None of the families and 0.5% of the population were living below the poverty line, including no under eighteens and 0.6% of those over 64.

References

External links
 Moore County Chamber of Commerce

Census-designated places in North Carolina
Census-designated places in Moore County, North Carolina